Christian Friedrich Wilhelm Freiherr von Ompteda (26 November 1765, in Ahlden an der Aller – 18 June 1815, in La Haye Sainte) was a Hanoverian officer of the Napoleonic Wars.

Life

In 1771, aged six, he was sent to be educated by his uncle Dietrich Heinrich Ludwig von Ompteda (1746–1803) and in 1777 he joined the Royal Corps of Pages at Hannover. In 1781 he became a lieutenant in the foot guards. In 1793 he rose to command a grenadier company in the French Revolutionary Wars, being badly wounded at Mont Cassel. Then in 1794, he went to England with Field Marshal Wilhelm von Freytag.

In 1803 he was a major in the Hanoverian guards regiment and, when the Convention of Artlenburg dissolved the Hanoverian army on 5 July that year, he was one of the first to join what became the King's German Legion. In 1805 he led an unsuccessful expedition to northern Germany during the War of the Third Coalition and a year later he and his battalion moved to Gibraltar. In 1807 they moved again, to Zeeland, where they fought against Denmark in the Gunboat War (also known as the English Wars). On the return journey, his ship sank off the coast of the Netherlands and he was held prisoner in Borkum until being freed in a prisoner exchange in 1808.

In 1812 he was made Oberstleutnant and in 1813 he was put in command of the Legion's 1st Light Battalion. In 1815 he was an oberst and a brigade commander in general Charles Alten's division within Wellington's army. Ompteda was killed at Waterloo after being ordered by the Prince of Orange into a counter-attack in column with the 5th Line Battalion to retake La Haye Sainte. He had been shot at point-blank range.

External links
Bernhard von Poten: Christian Freiherr von Ompteda. In: ‘'Allgemeine Deutsche Biographie'’ (ADB). Volume 24, Duncker & Humblot, Leipzig 1887, S. 353 f.

References

1765 births
1815 deaths
German military leaders of the French Revolutionary Wars
Military personnel killed in the Napoleonic Wars
German military personnel of the Napoleonic Wars
King's German Legion
German military personnel killed in action
People from Heidekreis
People from the Electorate of Hanover